Karen Emilia Castiblanco Duarte (born 9 January 1988) is a former Colombian tennis player and member of the Colombia Fed Cup team. On 24 October 2011, she reached her highest WTA ranking of 411 in singles whilst her best doubles ranking was 218 on 13 February 2012.

ITF Circuit finals

Singles: 4 (1 title, 3 runner-ups)

Doubles: 49 (27 titles, 22 runner-ups)

Notes

References

External links
 
 
 

1988 births
Living people
Colombian female tennis players
People from Cundinamarca Department
Tennis players at the 2011 Pan American Games
Pan American Games silver medalists for Colombia
Pan American Games medalists in tennis
Tennis players at the 2007 Pan American Games
Medalists at the 2007 Pan American Games
20th-century Colombian women
21st-century Colombian women